Sheikh Hissam-ud-Din was a figure in the history of Indian subcontinent and a leader of All India Majlis-e-Ahrar-ul-Islam. After the partition of India he left politics and struggle for Khatm-e-Nubuwwat movement with Syed Ata Ullah Shah Bukhari, chief of Majlis-e-Ahrar-e-Islam Pakistan. In 1953, he had a role in the movement of Tehreek-e-Khatme Nabuwwat. In 1958, the Ahrar organized again. At that time, Sheikh Hissam-ud-Din was elected for the seat of Secretary General of Majlis-e-Ahrar-e-Islam Pakistan .

References

Indian Muslims
Indian independence movement
Presidents of Majlis-e-Ahrar-ul-Islam
Secretary Generals of Majlis-e-Ahrar-ul-Islam